Giang is a Vietnamese name that may refer to

Surname
Chau Giang (born 1955), Vietnamese-born American poker player 
Cô Giang (1906–1930), Vietnamese revolutionary 
Đinh Thị Trà Giang (born 1992), Vietnamese volleyball player 
Emil Le Giang (born 1991), Slovak football striker of Vietnamese origin
Hoàng Hà Giang (1991–2015), Vietnamese taekwondo practitioner
Nguyen Thanh Long Giang (born 1988), Vietnamese footballer
Patrik Le Giang (born 1992), Slovak football goalkeeper of Vietnamese origin, brother of Emil
Phan Thanh Giang (born 1981), Vietnamese footballer 
Trà Giang, Vietnamese actress
Trần Trường Giang (born 1976), Vietnamese football midfielder
Trần Thị Hương Giang (born 1987), Vietnamese beauty pageant and fashion model
Trịnh Giang (1711–1762), Vietnamese ruler
Trịnh Linh Giang (born 1997), Vietnamese tennis player
Vũ Giáng Hương (1930–2011), Vietnamese painter

Vietnamese-language surnames